Marc Huster (born 1 July 1970 in Altdöbern) is a German weightlifter and sports commentator.

World Champion in Istanbul 1994, European Champion in Rijeka 1997, Riesa 1998, and Deportivo La Coruña 1999. World records in clean and jerk 1993 (210 kg) and 1996 (213.5 kg), world record in Olympic weightlifting combined 1994 (382.5 kg), European record in clean and jerk 1999 (215 kg).

He ranked 7th at the 1992 Summer Olympics in Barcelona, won a silver medal at the 1996 Summer Olympics in Atlanta in the 83 kg class, and another silver medal at the 2000 Summer Olympics in Sydney in the 85 kg class. Huster retired his weightlifting career in 2002.

Since 1997 he comments on weightlifting events for Eurosport, in 2002 he started working for German broadcaster Mitteldeutscher Rundfunk.

Weightlifting career bests 
 Snatch: 177.5 kg 1999 World Weightlifting Championships.
 Clean and jerk: 215.0 kg 1999 European Weightlifting Championships.
 Total: 390.0 kg 2000 Summer Olympics in the class to 85  kg.

External links 
 
 Marc Huster at Database Weightlifting
  

1970 births
Living people
People from Altdöbern
People from Bezirk Cottbus
German male weightlifters
Sportspeople from Brandenburg
Olympic weightlifters of Germany
Olympic silver medalists for Germany
Weightlifters at the 1992 Summer Olympics
Weightlifters at the 1996 Summer Olympics
Weightlifters at the 2000 Summer Olympics
Sports commentators
Olympic medalists in weightlifting
Medalists at the 2000 Summer Olympics
Medalists at the 1996 Summer Olympics
European Weightlifting Championships medalists
World Weightlifting Championships medalists